The 1975 Spanish Grand Prix was a Formula One motor race held at Montjuïc circuit on 27 April 1975. It was race 4 of 14 in both the 1975 World Championship of Drivers and the 1975 International Cup for Formula One Manufacturers. It is one of the most controversial and tragic race weekends in the sport's history after the death of four spectators who were hit by the crashing Hill GH1 of Rolf Stommelen. It was also the race in which Lella Lombardi became the first and so far only woman to score points towards the World Championship and future world champion Alan Jones made his first start.

It was the 21st Spanish Grand Prix since the race was first held in 1913. It was the fourth, and last, Grand Prix to be held on the Montjuïc street circuit. The race was shortened to 29 of its scheduled 75 laps, a race distance of 109 kilometres. The race was won by German driver Jochen Mass driving a McLaren M23. It would be the only Formula One win of his career. Mass had just a second lead over the Lotus 72E of Belgian driver Jacky Ickx when the race was declared. Argentine racer Carlos Reutemann was declared third in his Brabham BT44B, a lap behind the race leaders after a penalty was given to Jean-Pierre Jarier. This was the last win by a German driver until Michael Schumacher won the 1992 Belgian Grand Prix.

Race summary
Right from the start, the drivers who were members of the Grand Prix Drivers Association were furious that the barriers were not bolted together properly. Thus, they went on strike. Most of the sport's major players refused to take part in practice. Jacky Ickx was not a member of the GPDA, and one of the few marquee drivers who did practice.

Track staff worked overnight to fix the barriers, and to make sure everything would be fixed in time for qualifying on Saturday, some of the teams sent out mechanics to help. The drivers, though, still were not convinced, but the race organizers threatened legal action if no race was run. This, and rumors that the Guardia Civil would seize the cars which were in the paddock, which was at Montjuïc Stadium, forced the drivers to call off the strike.

The defending World Champion Emerson Fittipaldi, however, was still furious. He did the minimum three laps, but at a very slow pace, then pulled into the pits. The next morning, Fittipaldi announced he would not race, and went back home. Also during race day morning, Ken Tyrrell went out onto the circuit with his spanner to make sure the barriers were how they should be.

The two Ferraris of Niki Lauda (on pole) and Clay Regazzoni qualified on the front row, but their glory would not last long. At the start, Vittorio Brambilla's March tangled with Mario Andretti's Parnelli. Andretti's car hit the back of Lauda's, sending him into Regazzoni. Lauda was out immediately, while Regazzoni took his car to the garage, where repairs were made, and Regazzoni was sent back out. Patrick Depailler also retired on the first lap because of suspension damage, and Wilson Fittipaldi and Arturo Merzario withdrew in protest.

After the first-corner madness ceased, James Hunt was shown as the leader. Shockingly, Andretti had managed to keep going, and was running in second. John Watson was in third, Rolf Stommelen was fourth, Brambilla fifth, and Carlos Pace sixth.

On lap four, the engine in Jody Scheckter's Tyrrell blew, and the oil dumping onto the circuit caused Alan Jones and Mark Donohue to crash. Three laps later, Hunt also slipped in the oil and crashed. The top three had become Andretti, Watson, and Stommelen. Watson's car suffered from vibrations and dropped out. Andretti's rear suspension lasted only seven more laps before it failed, causing him to crash out of the lead. Jean-Pierre Jarier and Brambilla stopped to change tyres, whilst Tom Pryce and Tony Brise tangled. Stommelen was now in the top spot, followed by Pace, Ronnie Peterson, Jochen Mass, and Ickx. On lap 24, Peterson was out after he tangled with François Migault while trying to lap the Frenchman.

Two laps later, tragedy struck. The rear wing on Stommelen's Embassy Hill broke, sending him into the barrier, ironically at the point that his own mechanics had worked on. He bounced off it and back into the road, hitting the barrier across the way, and flying over it. While trying to avoid Stommelen as he crossed the track, Pace crashed. Four people were killed by Stommelen's flying car: fireman Joaquín Benaches Morera, spectator Andrés Ruiz Villanova, and two photo-journalists, Mario de Roia and Antonio Font Bayarri. Stommelen himself suffered a broken leg, a broken wrist and two cracked ribs.

The race continued for another four laps, during which Mass passed Ickx for the lead. On lap 29, the race was halted with Mass the winner, Ickx second, and Jean-Pierre Jarier crossed the line in third position. Carlos Reutemann finished fourth ahead of Brambilla in fifth. Lella Lombardi finished in sixth and became the only woman in Formula One history to score championship points. With the race being stopped before 60% of the scheduled race distance was reached, only half points were awarded for the first time in the history of the championship. After the race, stewards found that Jarier had overtaken in a portion of the track covered by a yellow flag caution. Jarier was given a sixty-second penalty that relegated him to fourth position.

Classification

Qualifying

Race

Championship standings after the race

Drivers' Championship standings

Constructors' Championship standings

Note: Only the top five positions are included for both sets of standings.

See also
 1955 Le Mans disaster, another racing incident involving the grandstand

References

Further reading

Prüller, Heinz (1975). Grand Prix Story 75: Lauda und ein Jahr wie kein anderes [Lauda and a year like no other]. In German. Vienna: Orac.  

Spanish Grand Prix
Spanish Grand Prix
Grand Prix
Spanish
Formula One controversies